Rodrigo Pereira Lima (born 18 November 1986), known as Rodrigo Biro, is a Brazilian footballer who plays for Água Santa as a left back.

Career statistics

References

External links

1986 births
Living people
People from Araçatuba
Brazilian footballers
Association football defenders
Campeonato Brasileiro Série A players
Clube Atlético Penapolense players
Mirassol Futebol Clube players
Footballers from São Paulo (state)